Lea Vukojević (born 6 April 1993) is a Croatian handball player who plays for ŽRK Zrinski Čakovec and the Croatia national team.

References

1993 births
Living people
Sportspeople from Koprivnica
Croatian female handball players